Sion-les-Mines is a commune in the Loire-Atlantique department in western France.

Geography
The river Chère flows westward through the commune.

See also
Communes of the Loire-Atlantique department

References

Sionlesmines